Ting may refer to:

Politics and government
 Thing (assembly) or ting, a historical Scandinavian governing assembly
 Ting (administrative unit) (亭), an administrative unit in China during the Qin and Han Dynasties
 Ting (廳,厅), an administrative unit (subprefecture) in China during the Qing Dynasty

Products and services
 Ting Inc., an internet service provider run by Tucows
 Ting Mobile, a cell phone service provider owned by Dish Wireless
 Ting (drink), a carbonated grapefruit beverage popular in the Caribbean

People
Ding (surname) or Ting, a Chinese surname
Ting (cartoonist), Merle Tingley (1922–2017), Canadian editorial cartoonist
Ting Ju ch'ang (1836–1895), Chinese admiral
Samuel C. C. Ting (born 1936), American physicist
Ting Tse-Ying, Chinese scholar and associate of the French writer Marcel Schwob

Other uses
 Ding (vessel) or ting, an ancient Chinese cauldron
 Ting, Iran, a village in Sistan and Baluchestan Province of Iran
 Ting River, a river in South China
 Ting, a 1992 album by Nits

See also
The Ting Tings, a British rock duo
Ding (disambiguation)
Thing (disambiguation)
Tyng (surname)